Nicodème is a given name of French origin. It corresponds to the name Nicodemus. People with that name include:

 Nicodème Audet (1822–1905), merchant and political figure in Quebec
 Nicodeme Boucher (born 1966), Senegalese football coach and former player
 Nicodème Kabamba (born 1936), Congolese footballer

See also
 Saint-Nicodème, a commune in the Côtes-d'Armor department of Brittany in northwestern France
 

French masculine given names